Jean Carlos Prada Pasedo (born August 4, 1984) is a male welterweight boxer from Venezuela, who represented his country at the 2004 Summer Olympics in Athens, Greece. He was defeated in the first round of the men's welterweight division (– 69 kg) by Uzbekistan's Sherzod Husanov on points: 20-33. He qualified for the Olympic Games by finishing in second place at the 2nd AIBA American 2004 Olympic Qualifying Tournament in Rio de Janeiro, Brazil.

Pro career
Jean Carlos Prada made his professional debut on ESPN Wednesday Night Fights against Puerto Rican Carlos Garcia. A four round fight where both fighters scored knockdowns. The bout went the distance, and was scored a draw. Since then, Prada went on to win 4 straight.

References

External links
Pro Record

1984 births
Living people
Welterweight boxers
Boxers at the 2004 Summer Olympics
Olympic boxers of Venezuela
Venezuelan male boxers
Central American and Caribbean Games bronze medalists for Venezuela
Competitors at the 2006 Central American and Caribbean Games
South American Games silver medalists for Venezuela
South American Games bronze medalists for Venezuela
South American Games medalists in boxing
Competitors at the 2006 South American Games
Central American and Caribbean Games medalists in boxing
Southpaw boxers
People from Cumaná
20th-century Venezuelan people
21st-century Venezuelan people